James Gregory Meredith (born 5 April 1988) is a retired Australian soccer player who played as a left back English Football League clubs Chesterfield, Shrewsbury Town, Bradford City and Millwall and for A-League Men clubs Perth Glory and Macarthur FC.

Meredith started his career with the Derby County youth system in 2004, signing a professional contract in 2006. He was loaned out to Cambridge United and Chesterfield before moving to Sligo Rovers. He returned to England with Shrewsbury Town, but after making only three appearances for them, joined A.F.C. Telford United on loan for most of the 2008–09 season. Meredith joined York City in 2009, playing in their victories in the 2012 FA Trophy Final and 2012 Conference Premier play-off Final, the latter seeing the club promoted to League Two.

Meredith signed for Bradford City in 2012, winning promotion to League One in his first season with victory in the 2013 League Two play-off Final. Meredith moved to Millwall in the Championship in 2017 before leaving two years later. In 2019, he returned to Australia to play in the A-League for Perth Glory and then Macarthur, where he retired and moved into coaching in 2022.

Meredith made two appearances for the Australian national team, both in 2015. He was a member of the Australian squad for the 2018 FIFA World Cup.

Early and personal life
Meredith was born in Albury, New South Wales. His father, Greg Pollard, was a squash player who ranked as highly as third in the world while playing in England. Meredith attended Scotch College in Melbourne, Victoria and grew up supporting South Melbourne FC and Manchester United F.C.

Meredith was in a relationship with glamour model Maria Fowler after meeting her through social networking website Myspace, although the two broke up in 2007.

Club career

Early career
Meredith was spotted playing soccer in Melbourne at the age of 16 by a Derby County scout. He was offered a trial by the club and he joined their youth system on a two-year contract in 2004. He progressed through the youth team and he signed a two-year professional contract with Derby on 19 July 2006. He joined Conference National club Cambridge United on a one-month loan on 19 October 2006 and he made his debut in a 3–0 defeat to Oxford United. He finished the loan with two appearances. He had a trial with Conference National club York City in January 2007, playing in a reserve-team match against Rotherham United. He joined League One team Chesterfield on a one-month loan on 19 February 2007, making one appearance as a left midfielder in a 2–0 defeat to Tranmere Rovers on 2 March. Following the expiry of the loan, Chesterfield opted against extending it.

Sligo Rovers
Meredith joined League of Ireland Premier Division club Sligo Rovers on a contract until the end of the 2007 season on 31 July 2007. He made his debut in a 2–0 defeat at Galway United on 24 August 2007 and he finished his time at the club with four appearances.

Shrewsbury Town
Meredith signed for League Two team Shrewsbury Town on 14 January 2008 on a one-and-a-half-year contract after training with the club, which included a clause that after making five appearances the contract could be renegotiated. He made his debut on 23 February 2008 in the 2–1 home defeat to Hereford United, finishing the 2007–08 season with three appearances, with his final match coming against Rochdale on the last day of the season. He was told that he did not figure in new manager Paul Simpson's immediate plans in July 2008, being left behind as the club travelled to Spain on a pre-season training camp.

Meredith joined Conference North club A.F.C. Telford United on 16 October 2008 on a one-month loan, saying "I don't see it as a step down but as a step up, because I've become stagnant at Shrewsbury". Meredith signed a further one-month extension with Telford in November 2008 and he scored the only goal in a 1–0 victory over Gateshead. The loan was again extended for a further month in December 2008, keeping him at the club until early January 2009. Telford were looking to extend his loan for the remainder of 2008–09, but a contractual hitch held this up. He eventually extended the loan on 8 January. Meredith played for Telford in both legs of the semi-final defeat to York City in the FA Trophy. He was handed a red card against Barrow in the semi-final of the Conference League Cup in March, which meant he would miss the Final because of a two-match suspension. He was substituted after breaking his nose in a 3–0 victory over Burscough in April. He played for Telford in the 2009 Conference North play-off Final on 8 May, which was lost 1–0 to Gateshead, meaning the team missed out on promotion to the Conference Premier. He finished the season with 46 appearances and one goal for Telford.

York City

He was offered a permanent contract by Telford after the end of the season, but he opted to join Conference Premier team York City on 22 May 2009. He made his debut in a 2–1 defeat to Oxford United on 8 August 2009. Meredith was sent off after receiving two yellow cards in a 1–1 draw against Oxford on 17 October 2009, which resulted in him being handed a one-match suspension for York's match against Luton Town. He signed a new contract with York on 29 March 2010 to keep him at the club until the summer of 2011. He played in both legs of York's play-off semi-final victory over Luton, which finished 2–0 on aggregate. He started in the 2010 Conference Premier play-off Final at Wembley Stadium on 16 May 2010, which York lost 3–1 to Oxford. He finished 2009–10 with 56 appearances for York.

Meredith had an operation on his knee during the summer of 2010. He made his first appearance of 2010–11 in the opening match, after starting a 2–1 defeat to Kidderminster Harriers on 14 August 2010. His first goal for York came in a 4–1 victory over league leaders AFC Wimbledon on 1 February 2011 after beating the offside trap to beat goalkeeper Seb Brown. He finished the season with 51 appearances and one goal. After rejecting two new contract offers with York, he eventually signed a new one-year contract with the club in May 2011.

Meredith won the 2012 FA Trophy Final with York at Wembley Stadium on 12 May 2012, in which they beat Newport County 2–0. Eight days later he played in the 2–1 victory over Luton in the 2012 Conference Premier play-off Final at Wembley, seeing the club return to the Football League after an eight-year absence with promotion to League Two. His 2011–12 season finished with 55 appearances and two goals for York, and was named in the 2011–12 Conference Premier Team of the Year alongside York teammate Matty Blair.

Bradford City

Meredith signed for League Two Bradford City on 29 June 2012 on a two-year contract. His debut came after starting in Bradford's opening match of 2012–13, a 1–0 victory away to League One team Notts County in the League Cup first round. Meredith scored his first goal for Bradford in a 3–1 home win against Cheltenham Town on 20 October 2012. He achieved promotion into League One in his first season with Bradford, playing in their 3–0 victory over Northampton Town in the 2013 League Two play-off Final at Wembley Stadium on 18 May 2013. He finished the season with 44 appearances and 1 goal.

Due to his strong performance as Bradford's starting left back during the 2016–17 League One season, Meredith was included in the PFA Team of the Year. He started for Bradford as they were beaten 1–0 by Millwall at Wembley Stadium in the 2017 League One play-off Final.

Millwall
Meredith signed for newly promoted Championship club Millwall on 29 May 2017 on a two-year contract. He made his debut in a 1–0 loss away to Nottingham Forest in Millwall's opening match of the 2017–18 Championship season on 4 August 2017. Millwall terminated Meredith's contract by mutual consent on 31 July 2019.

Perth Glory
Meredith signed for A-League club Perth Glory on 27 September 2019 on a one-year contract.

Macarthur
On 9 December 2020, Meredith joined Macarthur FC. Following the 2021–22 A-League Men season, Meredith retired from playing and joined Macarthur's coaching staff.

International career
In March 2015, Meredith expressed his desire to play for the Australia national team. Australia coach Ange Postecoglou said at the time that he was open to selecting a number of new players to the national team, including Meredith. Meredith was first called up by Australia for a 2018 FIFA World Cup qualifier against Jordan on 8 October 2015, for which he was an unused substitute as Australia lost 2–0. Meredith debuted for Australia on 12 November 2015, after being selected in the starting line-up for the 2018 FIFA World Cup qualifier against Kyrgyzstan, which the team won 3–0 at home. He only learned he would be starting on the morning of the match, and his family flew to Canberra from Melbourne to watch him. He made a second start in a win over Bangladesh four days later.

Meredith had not featured for Australia again by August 2017, when he stated his aim to be recalled to the Australia squad following his move to Millwall in the Championship. He was named in Australia's 23-man squad for the 2018 FIFA World Cup.

Style of play
Meredith primarily plays as a left back, although he has been described as being "versatile" and is able to play at centre back or in midfield. After signing for York in 2009, manager Martin Foyle described him as being "a very attack-minded, left-footed full-back with pace who can play the ball out from the back."

Career statistics

Club

International

Honours
York City
Conference Premier play-offs: 2012
FA Trophy: 2011–12

Bradford City
Football League Two play-offs: 2013

Individual
Conference Premier Team of the Year: 2011–12
PFA Team of the Year: 2016–17 League One

References

External links

Profile at the Perth Glory FC website
Profile at the Football Federation Australia website

1988 births
Living people
Sportspeople from Albury
Sportsmen from New South Wales
Soccer players from New South Wales
Australian soccer players
Australia international soccer players
Association football defenders
Derby County F.C. players
Cambridge United F.C. players
Chesterfield F.C. players
Sligo Rovers F.C. players
Shrewsbury Town F.C. players
AFC Telford United players
York City F.C. players
Bradford City A.F.C. players
Millwall F.C. players
Perth Glory FC players
Macarthur FC players
National League (English football) players
English Football League players
League of Ireland players
A-League Men players
2018 FIFA World Cup players
Australian expatriate soccer players
Expatriate footballers in England
Expatriate association footballers in the Republic of Ireland
Australian expatriate sportspeople in England
Australian expatriate sportspeople in Ireland
People educated at Scotch College, Melbourne